Line 18 (formerly known as Line 5A) of CRT is a rapid transit line in Chongqing, China.

Stations

Phase I 
Phase I of Line 18 is expected to be opened around 2023.

Phase II 
Currently under construction

References 

 
Transport infrastructure under construction in China